The Iglesia del Carmen de Burgos is a nun's convent in Burgos, Castile and León, Spain. 
It is situated on the corner of Calle de Covarrubias, del Progreso and Santa Clara. It is a Gothic edifice built mostly in the thirteenth century, at the time of its founding, when it was part of the Monasterio de Santa María la Real de Las Huelgas. It dates to 1234.

References

Roman Catholic churches in Burgos
Monasteries in Castile and León
Gothic architecture in Burgos
1234 establishments in Europe
Churches completed in 1234
13th-century establishments in Castile
13th-century Roman Catholic church buildings in Spain